Anthony Ujah (born 14 October 1990) is a Nigerian professional footballer who plays as a forward for German club Eintracht Braunschweig and the Nigeria national team.

Early life
Ujah grew up in the little town of Ugbokolo in Nigeria's Benue State.

Club career
Ujah began his career with Abuja F.C. In 2008, he was signed by Warri Wolves. He left Warri Wolves in January 2010 to attend a trial with Lillestrøm.

Lillestrøm

2010 season
Having impressed while attending the trial, Ujah signed a four-year contract with Lillestrøm and made his debut for the club on 14 March 2010 against Aalesunds FK.

In January 2011, Ujah was linked with a move to England with Football League One clubs Swindon Town and Southampton reportedly interested. On transfer deadline day, Ujah travelled to La Liga side Mallorca to discuss a move after Lillestrøm accepted a bid for the striker. However, no deal was signed, and Ujah started the 2011 campaign still in the Norway with Lillestrøm.

2011 season
In the first game of the season on 3 March 2011, Ujah scored four goals in Lillestrøm's 7–0 victory away against Stabæk. Following his strong performance, it was reported that PSV Eindhoven, among other European clubs such as Rennes, Lille, Toulouse and Sunderland, were keeping tabs on Ujah. Ujah added to his tally by scoring a brace in his side's 5–0 of FK Haugesund on 25 April. In May 2011, following his return of eight goals from the first six league matches for Lillestrøm, Ujah was linked to a host of bigger clubs from strong continental leagues including the Bundesliga, Ligue 1 and Eredivisie. A month later on 28 May, Ujah netted the winning goal in a 4–2 victory over Sarpsborg 08. On 19 June 2011, Ujah again hit four goals for Lillestrøm, this time against Strømsgodset, helping his side to a 4–2 win in the Tippeligaen. After just 15 months in Norway, he built up a tremendous rapport with the club's supporters and arguably attained an almost legend-like status unheard of for a 20-year-old. He ended up scoring 30 goals in 42 matches across all official competitions for Lillestrøm.

Mainz 05
In June 2011, Ujah signed for 1. FSV Mainz 05, after being tracked by several clubs, most notably Danish outfits F.C. Copenhagen and Brøndby IF. Ujah scored his first two goals for his new club in a 3–1 victory over VfB Stuttgart on 4 November, ending his side's winless run that stretched back to mid-August and moved them three points clear of the relegation zone.

On the last day of the summer 2012 transfer window, Ujah signed a season-loan to 1. FC Köln.

Werder Bremen
On 5 May 2015, SV Werder Bremen announced that they had signed Ujah on a four-year contract, starting from the 2015–16 season. On 24 October, Ujah scored a brace against his former club Mainz as Werder earned a 3–1 away win following five successive defeats. Four days laters, he netted again, helping Werder to a 1–0 victory over his former club 1. FC Köln in the second round of the DFB-Pokal. It was his first goal in a home match at the Weserstadion.

Liaoning Whowin
On 5 July 2016, Werder Bremen announced Ujah would be joining Liaoning Whowin pending a medical for a reported transfer fee of €13 million. Both player and club had rejected a similar offer from Liaoning Whowin in the previous winter transfer window. Two days later, the move was finalised with Ujah signing a three-year contract. On 8 July 2016, Ujah scored on his debut for Liaoning in a 2–1 win over Shijiazhuang Ever Bright.

Return to Mainz 05
In December, it was announced that Ujah would return to the Bundesliga having re-signed with former club 1. FSV Mainz 05 on a -year contract until 2021.

Union Berlin
In June 2019, Ujah's move to 1. FC Union Berlin, newly promoted to the Bundesliga, for the 2019–20 season was agreed. He signed a three-year deal.

Eintracht Braunschweig 
On 2 August 2022, Ujah signed with Eintracht Braunschweig on a one-year contract, with an optional extra year.

International career
At the end of May 2011, Ujah was called up to the U23 Nigerian National Team that faced Tanzania on 5 June 2011.

He was selected for Nigeria's squad at the 2013 FIFA Confederations Cup.

Career statistics

References

External links
 
 

1990 births
Living people
People from Benue State
Association football forwards
Nigerian footballers
Nigeria international footballers
2013 FIFA Confederations Cup players
Abuja F.C. players
Lillestrøm SK players
1. FSV Mainz 05 players
1. FC Köln players
Kano Pillars F.C. players
Warri Wolves F.C. players
SV Werder Bremen players
Liaoning F.C. players
1. FC Union Berlin players
Eintracht Braunschweig players
Bundesliga players
2. Bundesliga players
Eliteserien players
Chinese Super League players
Nigerian expatriate footballers
Nigerian expatriate sportspeople in Norway
Expatriate footballers in Norway
Nigerian expatriate sportspeople in Germany
Expatriate footballers in Germany
Nigerian expatriate sportspeople in China
Expatriate footballers in China